The 1948 Sul Ross Lobos football team represented Sul Ross State University during the 1948 college football season. In their third season under head coach Paul Pierce, the Lobos compiled a 10–0–1 record, won the New Mexico Conference (NMC) with a 5–0 record against conference opponents, and outscored their opponents by a total of 452 to 133. Sul Ross was invited to the 1949 Tangerine Bowl, where they tied 9–1 Murray State.

Schedule

References

Sul Ross
Sul Ross Lobos football seasons
College football undefeated seasons
Sul Ross Lobos football